The Yangbajain Geothermal Field (羊八井地热田) is a geothermal field near the town of Yangbajain in Damxung County, Tibet Autonomous Region, China.
The fluid is heated by magmatic activity not far below the surface.
It is a tourist attraction and also supplies steam to a major power plant with 25 MW capacity.

Location

The Yangbajain geothermal field is in a plateau basin on the southern slopes of the Nyainqentanglha Mountains, near to the Qinghai–Tibet Highway (China National Highway 318) in Damxung County.
The Qinghai–Tibet Railway, which terminates in Lhasa, also passes through Yangbajain.
It delivers natural thermal energy at the ground surface of up to 107,000 kilocalories per second.
Yangbajain Geothermal Field is currently the largest proven geothermal field of its nature in China.
It has an estimated power generation potential of 150,000 kW.

Geology

The Yangbajing Basin lies between the Nyainquentanglha Range to the northwest and the Yarlu-Zangbo suture to the south.
The geothermal field is in the central part of a semi-graben fault-depression basin caused by the foremontane fault zone of the Nyainqentanglha Mountains.
The SE-dipping detachment fault began to form about 8 Ma.
Most of the outcropped rocks are metamorphosed lower Paleozoic rocks, Paleogene volcano-clastic rock series, Neogene conglomerates and loose sediment accumulations from the Quaternary. The fault structures in the region run NE, NW, and nearly N-S. 
The NE faults are the largest and oldest, and usually have been cut by later fractures and faults.
Although there still seems to be frequent magmatic activity, the main stages of magmatic intrusion were the Yanshanian granitic intrusion (88.7 Ma), the Yanshanian dioritic intrusion (88.0 Ma), and the Later Himalayan granitic intrusion (29.7 Ma).

The field is part of the Himalayan Geothermal Belt in the Lhasa-Gangdise terrane.
The geothermal reservoir is basically a Quaternary basin underlaid by a large granite batholith.
The basin has been filled with glacial deposits from the north and alluvial-pluvial sediments from the south.
Fluid flows horizontally into the reservoir through the faults around the basin.

Chemical analysis of the thermal fluid indicate that there is shallow-seated magmatic activity not far below the geothermal field.
In the area north of the highway, thermal fluids from this depth rises through a deep fault to the surface.
In the area south of the highway, thermal fluid in the surface zone is heated by mixing with fluids that in turn are heated by deep circulation near the magmatic heat source.
Carbon dioxide in the hot spring gases is probably largely organic, from the sedimentary rocks of the field.

Both the upper and lower reservoirs contained sodium chloride thermal water.
Its basement is Himalayan granite and tuff. The water is a mixture of cold groundwater and deep thermal water.
The thermal water is held in tectonic fissures and fracture zones.
The isotopic composition of the thermal waters indicates local meteoric origin (rain and snow), including run-off from the Nyainquentanglha Range. 
The water runs down through the fractured rock, and is gradually warmed, with the warmer water rising towards the surface.

Recreational use

Yangbajing has been called "the highest-altitude hot springs in the world."
It includes hot springs and boiling springs, geysers and hot water lakes.
Various facilities for tourists have been developed in the field.
A resort developed by government agencies in 1998 has hot spring baths that are reputed to have curative powers.
There are two warm indoor pools and an outdoor pool where tourists can relax in spectacular mountain surroundings.
A  hot water lake lies to the east of the geothermal ground, from which steam rises high in the air on a clear day.
The local people have made pools for bathing in the west of the lake.
The geothermal field is also used to operate greenhouses.

Power plant

The  Yangbajain Geothermal Station was established in 1977.
It is the first geothermal power station to be built in Tibet and is the largest geothermal steam power plant in China.
4,000 kW of electricity from Yangbajain began to be delivered to Lhasa in 1981 along a transmission line that runs southeast along the Duilong River.
It was the main source of power for Lhasa until the Yamdrok Hydropower Station came into operation in 1998.
By the end of 2000 eight steam turbo generators had been installed at the Yangbajain Geothermal Station, each with capacity of 3 MW, giving a total of 25 MW.
The geothermal field delivers 25.181 MW, or 100 GWh annually, to the city of Lhasa to the south.
As of 2000 the Yangbajing power plants were using 1,200 tons per day of water from the shallow reservoir, but pressure was falling fast and the turbines could not operate at full capacity.
Deeper wells were being drilled to tap into lower-lying thermal fluid.

Pollution

Although rivers in Tibet are generally considered to be clean, the water of the Duilong River is not. 
A 2015 study reported that during the non-monsoon season the levels of arsenic in the river, at 205.6 μg/L were higher than the WHO guideline of 10 μg/L for drinking water.
The source of the pollution seems to be untreated water from the Yangbajain Geothermal Field power station.

References

Sources

Geothermal power stations in China